Raymond Hayes Crone (born August 7, 1931) is a retired American professional baseball player and scout. In his playing days, he was a right-handed pitcher who played in Major League Baseball for the Milwaukee Braves from 1954 to 1957 and the New York / San Francisco Giants in 1957 and 1958.

Early life
Prior to playing professionally, Crone attended Memphis, Christian Brothers High School. He signed a professional contract with the Boston Braves in 1949 at the age of 17 and began his career that season. He was used primarily as a starting pitcher in his early minor league career, reaching win totals as high as 19, accomplishing that in 1953 with the Jacksonville Braves. That year, the Braves franchise transferred to Milwaukee.

Major league career
Crone made his major league debut on April 13, 1954, at age 22. He spent 19 games with the big league club, starting two of them and going 1–0 with a 2.02 ERA in 49 innings of work. Of all pitchers on the team that season, he had the second-lowest ERA (trailing only Charlie Gorin's 1.86). He also spent 14 games in the minor leagues that season.

With the Braves in 1955, Crone went 10–9 with a 3.46 ERA in 33 games (15 starts). In 140 innings pitched, he allowed only 117 hits. Though he spent time in the minors in 1955, it was a short stint – only four games.

He went 11–10 with a 3.87 ERA in 35 games in 1956. Crone began the 1957 season with the Braves, going 3–1 with a 4.46 ERA in 11 games (five starts). On June 15, he was traded with Danny O'Connell and Bobby Thomson to the New York Giants for Hall of Famer Red Schoendienst. He went 4–8 with a 4.33 ERA with the Giants that year, and went a combined 7–9 with a 4.36 ERA.

Crone played his final major league season in 1958, going 1–2 with a 6.75 ERA in 14 games (one start). On July 15 of that year, he was traded to the Toronto Maple Leafs for Don Johnson. He finished the season in the minor leagues, playing his final big league game on July 14. Crone pitched in the minors until 1961, when he was 29 years old. In each of the final three seasons of his minor league career, Crone did not post a winning percentage over .444.

Career totals
Over the course of his five-year major league career, Crone went 30–30 with a 3.87 ERA in 137 games (61 starts). In 546 innings pitched, he struck out 260 batters and walked 173. He allowed 554 hits.

He spent 11 seasons in the minors, going 90–77 in 244 games. Although a .115 hitter (18-for-156) with just 5 RBI in his major league career, he fielded his position well, posting a .993 fielding percentage, committing only one error in 134 total chances.

Longtime scout
A decade after retiring from the mound, Crone became a scout, based in Texas and working for the Montreal Expos, Baltimore Orioles, San Diego Padres and, as of 2017, the Arizona Diamondbacks. His son, Ray Jr., is a scout for the Detroit Tigers, and formerly worked in that capacity for the Orioles and Boston Red Sox.

References

External links

Baseball Gauge
Venezuelan Professional Baseball League

1931 births
Living people
Arizona Diamondbacks scouts
Atlanta Crackers players
Baltimore Orioles scouts
Baseball players from Memphis, Tennessee
Birmingham Barons players
Dallas Rangers players
Evansville Braves players
Hartford Chiefs players
Indios de Oriente players
Jacksonville Braves players
Jacksonville Jets players
Major League Baseball pitchers
Memphis Chickasaws players
Milwaukee Braves players
Montreal Expos scouts
New York Giants (NL) players
Owensboro Oilers players
Portland Beavers players
San Diego Padres scouts
San Francisco Giants players
Toledo Sox players
Toronto Maple Leafs (International League) players
Christian Brothers University alumni